Al Yaum (Arabic: اليوم; The Day or Today) is a Dammam-based, supposedly pro-government Arabic daily newspaper published in Dammam, Saudi Arabia. The paper has been in circulation since 1965

History and ownership
Al Yaum was first published in Dammam in 1965. Initially, it was a weekly eight-page magazine. Its frequency and size improved over time, becoming a daily newspaper in 1978. The owner and publisher of the paper is Dar Al Yaum Organization for Printing and Publishing. The headquarters of Al Yaum is in Dammam. 

Hamid Ghuyarfi was the editor-in-chief of Al Yaum until 1981 when he was dismissed due to his criticism against Saudi government. One of the other former editors-in-chief was Othman Al Omeir who is the owner of the liberal Arabic news portal Elaph. Muhammad Abdallah Al Wail also served as the editor-in-chief of the paper.

The daily was the first in the Middle East and the second in the world to get IFRA ISO certificate, the first in the Middle East to receive the IFRA Asia Award for best in print, and the first in the Middle East to become the WAN-IFRA Star Club member and the Color Quality Club member.

Content and format
Being a native paper of the Eastern Province Al Yaum critically covered negative living conditions of local people in the region before the Qatif uprising in 1979. 

The paper mostly covers news in relation to Dammam and nearby regions. It also covers regional news, sports events, and social issues that are of interest to the readers in Saudi Arabia and Arab states of the Persian Gulf. The paper is published in broadsheet format with 28 colour and black and white pages.

Distribution and circulation
Although the paper focuses on the local news and mainly serves the Eastern province, it is distributed across the Persian Gulf region. It is the leading newspaper in the Eastern province.

The paper sold 6,000 copies in 1975. The estimated 2003 circulation of Al Yaum was 80,000 copies. Its 2007 circulation was 135,000 copies.

Bans and arrests
Although the daily is described as pro-government it has experienced suspensions and arrests of its correspondents. In 1982, one of its reporters was detained for two years. In May of the same year the paper was suspended by the Saudi government due to the fact that its literary supplement became popular among the progressive and leftist young writers who were close to the Communist Party in Saudi Arabia and the Socialist Action Party in the Arabian Peninsula (Hizb alʿamal al-ishtiraki fi al-jazira al-ʿarabiyya).

See also

 List of newspapers in Saudi Arabia

References

External links

1965 establishments in Saudi Arabia
Arabic-language newspapers
Censorship in Saudi Arabia
Mass media in Dammam
Newspapers published in Saudi Arabia
Publications established in 1965